The 2010–11 Baylor Lady Bears women's basketball team were coached by Kim Mulkey. The Bears are a member of the Big 12 Conference.

Preseason

Roster

Schedule
 The Bears will participate in several notable events.

|-
!colspan=9| Regular season

|-
!colspan=9| Big 12 Tournament

|-
!colspan=9| 2011 NCAA tournament

Player stats

Postseason
Baylor received a #1 seed in the Dallas region.  They defeated Prairie View A&M at home in the Ferrell Center, 66-30 and West Virginia 82-68, to advance to their sixth Sweet Sixteen in the last eight seasons.  They beat 5th seeded Green Bay 86-76 in Dallas.  They played Texas A&M for the fourth time in 2011 and were defeated by a 58-46 score.

Awards and honors
Brittney Griner, 2011 WBCA National Defensive Player of the Year
Brittney Griner, Finalist, 2011 Wooden Award

All-Americans
 Brittney Griner, AP All-American first-team
Melissa Jones, AP All-American honorable mention
 Odyssey Sims, AP All-American first-team honorable mention

Team players drafted into the WNBA

References

Baylor Bears women's basketball seasons
Baylor Lady Bears